Mordellistena incommunis is a beetle in the genus Mordellistena of the family Mordellidae. It was described in 1921 by Liljeblad.

References

incommunis
Beetles described in 1921